Ixodiphagus is a genus of encyrtid wasp. They lay their eggs into ticks.

Species 
I. brunneus (Girault, 1925)
I. hirtus Nikol'skaya, 1950
I. hookeri (Howard, 1908)
I. mysorensis Mani, 1941
I. sagarensis (Geevarghese, 1977)
I. texanus Howard, 1907
I. theilerae (Fiedler, 1953)

Synonyms 
The following synonyms of Ixodiphagus are known:
 Australzaomma Girault, 1925
 Hunterellus Howard, 1908

References

External links 
 Ixodiphagus at the Universal Chalcidoidea Database

Encyrtinae
Hymenoptera genera
Parasites of arthropods